Mattias Mitku (born 20 July 2001) is a Swedish footballer who plays for Eskilstuna as a midfielder.

References

External links 
 Djurgården profile 

2001 births
Living people
Association football forwards
Footballers from Stockholm
Swedish footballers
Allsvenskan players
Djurgårdens IF Fotboll players
IF Karlstad Fotboll players